Fălcoiu is a commune in Olt County, Oltenia, Romania. It is composed of three villages: Cioroiașu, Cioroiu and Fălcoiu.

Natives
 Vasile Popa

References

Communes in Olt County
Localities in Oltenia